Ginebis hamadai is a species of sea snail, a marine gastropod mollusk in the family Eucyclidae.

References

External links
 To World Register of Marine Species

hamadai
Gastropods described in 1980